Hoseyn Beygi (also Romanized as Ḩoseyn Beygī; also known as Ḩoseyn Yagī) is a village in Buzi Rural District, in the Central District of Shadegan County, Khuzestan Province, Iran. At the 2006 census, its population was 85, in 16 families.

References 

Populated places in Shadegan County